This is a partial list of current and defunct mines in Michigan.

See also
 List of Copper Country mines

Michigan
Mines